Telinea d.o.o. Bihać is a MMDS TV, IPTV, broadband Internet and fixed telephony service provider in Bihać, Una-Sana Canton, Bosnia and Herzegovina.

The company was founded in 2008 and its headquarters is located in Bihać.

References

External links
 Official website of Telinea Bihać
 RAK BiH

Communications in Bosnia and Herzegovina
Internet service providers of Bosnia and Herzegovina
Cable television companies
Internet service providers
Companies of Bosnia and Herzegovina
Telecommunications companies established in 2008
Internet properties established in 2008